Georg Hochgesang (3 November 1897 – 12 June 1988) was a German football forward, who played for 1. FC Nürnberg and Fortuna Düsseldorf, and manager. He also represented the Germany national team, winning six caps and scoring four goals between 1924 and 1927.

Honours
 German football championship: 1924, 1925, 1927, 1933

References

External links
 
 

1897 births
1988 deaths
Footballers from Nuremberg
Association football forwards
German footballers
Germany international footballers
1. FC Nürnberg players
Fortuna Düsseldorf players
German football managers
Hamburger SV managers
VfL Bochum managers
Fortuna Düsseldorf managers